Mason Taylor is an American football tight end for the LSU Tigers.

High school career
Taylor attended St. Thomas Aquinas High School in Fort Lauderdale, Florida. He committed to Louisiana State University (LSU) to play college football.

College career
Taylor earned playing time his true freshman year at LSU in 2022. In his first career game, he had four receptions for 34 yards. In week 10 against Alabama, he caught the game winning 2 point conversion that helped LSU gain their first home win over Alabama since 2010.

Personal life
His father is Pro Football Hall of Famer, Jason Taylor. His uncle also a Pro Football Hall of Famer Zach Thomas,  played in the NFL.

References

External links
LSU Tigers bio

Living people
Players of American football from Fort Lauderdale, Florida
American football tight ends
LSU Tigers football players
Year of birth missing (living people)